René Raphy (27 December 1920 – 11 May 2008) is a former French footballer.

References

External links

 René Raphy's profile
 La Liga profile

1920 births
2008 deaths
People from Saint-Mandé
French footballers
Stade Français (association football) players
Stade Rennais F.C. players
Angers SCO players
OGC Nice players
La Liga players
Real Murcia players
Ligue 1 players
S.S.D. Sanremese Calcio players
Ligue 2 players
Association football forwards
Footballers from Val-de-Marne